Stanislav Cifka is a Czech chess, poker, Magic: the Gathering, Hearthstone, and Artifact player. He is also a FIDE master in chess. His esports alias is simply StanCifka, a contraction or anglicization of his name.

Career

Magic: the Gathering 
He was formerly active in Magic: the Gathering before Hearthstone was released. He is best known for winning Pro Tour Return to Ravnica in 2012, which is one of the top-tier tournaments of the game. He lost only one match. He was given a special invitation by Wizards of the Coast to play in an exhibition match in Pro Tour 25th Anniversary due to his achievement outside Magic.

Hearthstone 
Cifka started playing the PC collectible card game Hearthstone when it was released. StanCifka was part of Luminosity Gaming for part of 2015. In October 2015 Cifka broke Thijs "ThijsNL" Molendijk's winning streak by winning the StarLadder finals. As of May 2018 he is ranked 1st by gosugamers.net, a site that ranks players worldwide.

In 2017, Cifka led the Czech National Team to a first-place finish in the 2017 Hearthstone Global Games. In January 2018, he joined team Omnislash. He was crowned winner of the event after beating Jason Chan (Amaz) in a "Hearthstone-Players-Finals" in August 2018.

Artifact 
In November 2018, Cifka posted a video to YouTube announcing that he would be retiring from Hearthstone to pursue a career in Artifact. Cifka announced in February 2019 that he left team Omnislash, due to the team's focus on Hearthstone over Artifact.

Magic: The Gathering achievements

References

External links
 

Living people
Czech chess players
Chess FIDE Masters
Czech esports players
Czech Magic: The Gathering players
Hearthstone players
People from Český Krumlov
Twitch (service) streamers
Czech YouTubers
Year of birth missing (living people)